Joseph "Joe" Graves is a Republican politician. Graves was a member of the Michigan House of Representatives.

Education 
Graves has a bachelor's degree in Business Admonistration from Siena Heights University.

Career 
Graves was a real estate agent before entering politics.
Graves was first elected to the state legislature in February 2012 to fill the vacancy caused by the recall of Republican Paul H. Scott.

Personal life 
Graves' wife is Denise. They have four children.

References

External links 
 Joseph Graves's Biography at gophouse.com via archive.org

Living people
Siena Heights University alumni
Republican Party members of the Michigan House of Representatives
21st-century American politicians
Year of birth missing (living people)